Jonkheer Charles Louis du Bois de Vroylande (21 January 1835 – 30 December 1888) was a Belgian lawyer and politician.  He was governor of the province of Antwerp from 24 March 1887 until 30 December 1888.

Political career 
Charles du Bois de Vroylande was a member of the Provincial council of Antwerp for the Canton Zandhoven from 3 July 1866 until 23 May 1886, and provincial deputy from 6 July 1876 until 1886.  He was a member of the communal council of Halle until 1876 and burgomaster from 1862 until 1876.

Sources 
 Steve Heylen, Bart De Nil, Bart D’hondt, Sophie Gyselinck, Hanne Van Herck en Donald Weber, Geschiedenis van de provincie Antwerpen. Een politieke biografie, Antwerpen, Provinciebestuur Antwerpen, 2005, Vol. 2 p. 79

1835 births
1888 deaths
Governors of Antwerp Province
Politicians from Antwerp
People from Zoersel
Flemish nobility